Miss World Philippines 2012 was the 2nd edition of the Miss World Philippines pageant. It was held at the Manila Hotel in Manila, Philippines on June 24, 2012.

At the end of the event, Gwendoline Ruais crowned Queenierich Rehman as Miss World Philippines 2012. Mary Ann Misa was named as First Princess, Vanessa Ammann as Second Princess, April Love Jordan as Third Princess, and Brenna Cassandra Gamboa as Fourth Princess.

Results
Color key
  The contestant was a Semi-Finalist in an International pageant.

Special Awards

Judges 

 Lorna Tolentino – Actress
 James Younghusband – Professional football player
 Ramon “Bong” Revilla Jr. – Incumbent Senator of the Philippines
 Juan Edgardo Angara – Aurora Representative
 Jorge Estregan Ejercito Jr. – Governor of Laguna
 Jose David Lina Jr. – Former Senator of the Philippines and current president of the Manila Hotel

Contestants
25 contestants competed for the title.

Notes

Post-pageant Notes 

 Queenierich Rehman competed at the Miss World 2012 pageant in Ordos where she finished as a Top 15 semifinalist.
 Rizzini Alexis Gomez competed at Mutya ng Pilipinas 2012 where she won the Mutya ng Pilipinas-Tourism 2012 title. She competed at the Miss Tourism International 2012 pageant in Malaysia and won the international crown. On October 13, 2015, Gomez died due to lung cancer.

References

2012 beauty pageants
2012 in the Philippines
2012